Nick Rosen (born 21 August 1974) is an American filmmaker living in Colorado. He is a partner, writer, and producer at Sender Films.  He is the director, with his partner Peter Mortimer, of the Emmy-winning documentary film Valley Uprising and the  National Geographic series, First Ascent, and a co-creator of the REEL ROCK Film Tour.

Biography
Rosen was born in Quebec, Canada. He attended Colorado College graduating with a B.A. in political science. He later attended the Columbia University School of International and Public Affairs, receiving his masters. He had a ten-year career as a freelance journalist working for various publications such as LA Weekly and Boulder Weekly.  Nick began working as a writer/producer/director with Sender Films in 2005.

Nick has also developed a career as on-screen talent, starring in the yoga documentary, 'Enlighten Up!' (2008).

Filmography
First Ascent (2006)
King Lines (2007)
 Enlighten Up! (2008)
The Sharp End (2008)
First Ascent: The Series (2010)
Reel Rock Film Tour 2010
Reel Rock Film Tour 2011
Valley Uprising (2014)
 The Dawn Wall (2018)
 The Alpinist (2021)
Reel Rock 10 (2015)
Reel Rock 11 (2016)
Reel Rock 12 (2017)

Awards and nominations

King Lines (2007)

Sports Emmy: Outstanding Camera Work

First Ascent (2011)

Sports Emmy: Outstanding Camera Work

Valley Uprising (2014)

News and Documentary Emmy: Outstanding Graphic Design & Art Direction

References

External links
Sender Films

Living people
School of International and Public Affairs, Columbia University alumni
1974 births
American film producers